Salghari-Zoom Assembly constituency is one of the 32 assembly constituencies of Sikkim a north east state of India. Salghari-Zoom is part of Sikkim Lok Sabha constituency.

Members of Legislative Assembly
 2009: Madan Cintury, Sikkim Democratic Front
 2014: Arjun Kumar Ghatani, Sikkim Democratic Front

Election results

2019

See also

 Salghari
 West Sikkim district
 List of constituencies of Sikkim Legislative Assembly

References

Assembly constituencies of Sikkim
Gyalshing district